Muhammad Zuhair Masharqa (1938 – 23 April 2007) was a Syrian politician who served as Vice President of Syria from 1984 to 2005.

Early life and education
Masharqa came from a Sunni family. He received a bachelor's degree in education from Damascus University in 1961. He also obtained a degree in law from Aleppo University in 1968.

Career
His first public post was governor of Hama to which he was appointed in 1973. Masharqa became a member of the Baath Party in 1975. Later he became deputy director of the party. Masharqa was appointed to the cabinet in 1978 as Minister of Education and became vice president for Domestic Affairs on 11 March 1984. He was the country's longest serving vice president, in office from 1984 to 2005, and was particularly noted for his loyalty to Hafez Assad. After the death of Assad in 2000, a 9-member committee was formed to oversee the transition period, and Masharqa was among its members.

Bashar Assad chose to retain him as a vice president up to his retirement in 2005. He was replaced by Farouk Sharaa as vice president.

Personal life
Masharqa was married and had five children.

Death and burial
Masharqa died due to a massive heart attack in Damascus on 23 April 2007. His body was buried in Aleppo.

References

1938 births
2007 deaths
Damascus University alumni
University of Aleppo alumni
Vice presidents of Syria
Syrian ministers of education
People from Aleppo
Members of the Regional Command of the Arab Socialist Ba'ath Party – Syria Region
Syrian Sunni Muslims